The women's synchronised 3 metre springboard diving competition at the 2016 Summer Olympics in Rio de Janeiro took place on 7 August at the Maria Lenk Aquatic Center in Barra da Tijuca.

Competition format

The competition was held in a single stage with each two-person team making five rounds of dives. There were eleven judges scoring each dive made by each team - three judges for each diver; six in total, and five judges for synchronisation.  Only the middle score counted for each diver, with the middle three counting for synchronisation.  These five scores were averaged, multiplied by 3, and multiplied by the dive's degree of difficulty to give a total dive score.  The scores for each of the five dives were summed to give a final score.

Schedule 
Times are Brasília time, BRT (UTC−03:00)

Results

References

Diving at the 2016 Summer Olympics
2016
2016 in women's diving
Women's events at the 2016 Summer Olympics